Berkshire Lakes is a census-designated place (CDP) in western Collier County, Florida, United States.

Berkshire Lakes was first listed as a CDP prior to the 2020 census.

Demographics

References 

Census-designated places in Collier County, Florida
Census-designated places in Florida